The Walcott-Whitney House is a historic late First Period house in Stow, Massachusetts.  It is a -story timber-frame house, five bays wide, with a side gable roof, clapboard siding, and a large central chimney.  A leanto extends to the rear, giving it a saltbox profile.  The front facade is asymmetrical, with a roughly centered entrance that has a Federal period surround of sidelights, pilasters, and entablature with cornice.  The house was built c. 1720–30, and is a well-preserved example of the period.  It is particularly noted for its well-preserved front staircase.

The house was listed on the National Register of Historic Places in 1990.

See also
National Register of Historic Places listings in Middlesex County, Massachusetts

References

Houses on the National Register of Historic Places in Middlesex County, Massachusetts
Stow, Massachusetts